Merlin II or Merlin 2 may refer to:
 Swearingen Merlin II, an airplane
 Merlin II, an aeroengine in the Rolls-Royce Merlin line
 Merlin II, a telephone system in the AT&T Merlin line
 Merlin 2, a rocket engine concept by SpaceX